The 65th David di Donatello ceremony, presented by the Accademia del Cinema Italiano, honored the best in Italian cinema released from 1 March 2020 to 28 February 2021. The ceremony was hosted by presenter Carlo Conti on 8 May 2020, initially set on 3 April 2020 but was postponed due to COVID-19 pandemic.

Crime drama film The Traitor won six awards, including Best Film, out of eighteen nominations. Other winners included Pinocchio with five, The First King: Birth of an Empire with three, The Goddess of Fortune with two, 5 is the Perfect Number, Bangla, Il flauto magico di Piazza Vittorio, Martin Eden, My Brother Chases Dinosaurs, Once Upon a Time... in Bethlehem, Parasite, Selfie and Timo's Winter with one.

Winners and nominees

Winners are listed first, highlighted in boldface, and indicated with a double dagger (‡). The nominations were announced on 18 February 2020.

Films with multiple nominations and awards

References

External links

David di Donatello
2019 film awards
2020 film awards
May 2020 events in Italy
Events postponed due to the COVID-19 pandemic
Impact of the COVID-19 pandemic on cinema
Impact of the COVID-19 pandemic on television